Tomiko Miyao  (April 13, 1926  December 30, 2014) was a Japanese novelist. She is best known for writing historical fiction. Many of her works were adapted into television dramas and films, most notably Onimasa, Atsuhime, and Yoshitsune.

Early life and education 
Miyao was born in Kochi, Japan on April 13, 1926. Her father was a gambler who worked as an agent for prostitutes. She graduated from middle school in 1943, then dropped out of high school to get away from her father. She moved to a new town and became a substitute teacher. She married her coworker, a teacher named Kaoru Maeda, in 1944. They had a daughter and briefly moved to Manchuria. When World War II ended in 1945, the family was held in an internment camp until 1946, when they returned to Japan and lived with her husband's family in Kochi prefecture.

Career 
Miyao's writing career first gained attention when her short story "Ren" won the Fujin Kōron prize for new women writers in 1962. She then moved to Tokyo in 1966 and became a magazine editor. She continued writing for women's magazines and won the Osamu Dazai prize in 1974. Though she hated her father's profession, she wrote a story about his profession, "Kantsubaki". In 1978 she won the Naoki prize for her novel "Ichigen no koto". She went on to write prolifically throughout the rest of her career, winning several other awards such as the Kikuchi Kan prize and the Elan d'or. She was named a Person of Cultural Merit in 2008.

Miyao died on December 30, 2014.

Style 
Miyao's novels typically center around women going through hardship. She often writes about them compassionately and sensitively.

Bibliography

References 

1926 births
2014 deaths

20th-century Japanese novelists
Writers from Kōchi Prefecture